William Buttress (25 November 1827 – 25 August 1866) was an English first-class cricketer active 1849–61 who played for Cambridge Town Club (aka Cambridgeshire) as a right-arm slow medium pace bowler.

Cricket 
In 17 first-class matches, he took 83 wickets with a best return of seven for 35. He achieved five wickets in an innings nine times and ten in a match twice. He batted right-handed as a tailender and held eleven catches as a fielder.

He played county cricket for Cambridgeshire, Suffolk, Norfolk, Huntingdonshire, Leicestershire, Devon, Dorset, Cheshire, Bedfordshire and (in 1852-53) Shropshire while being professional at Shrewsbury Cricket Club.

Personal life 
Buttress married Sarah Mott, a laundress, in Cambridge on 25 June 1848. The pair went on to have four children. Researcher Willie Sugg indicates that he was a keen practical joker, and that he struggled financially later for long periods of his career, being apparently assisted by John Walker (a former Cambridge University cricketer).

Buttress was born in Cambridge and died there aged 38, due to tuberculosis.

References

1827 births
1866 deaths
English cricketers
Cambridge Town Club cricketers
North v South cricketers
19th-century deaths from tuberculosis
Tuberculosis deaths in England